The 2015 WAFF U-23 Championship was an international football tournament held in Qatar from 30 September to 14 October 2015. It is the first edition of the U-23 age group competition organised by the West Asian Football Federation. 

The ten national teams involved in the tournament were required to register a squad of at most 23 players, including three goalkeepers. Only players in these squads were eligible to take part in the tournament. Players born on or after 1 January 1992 were eligible to compete in the tournament.

The full squad listings are below. The age listed for each player is on 30 September 2015, the first day of the tournament. The nationality for each club reflects the national association (not the league) to which the club is affiliated. A flag is included for coaches who are of a different nationality than their own national team. Players in boldface were capped at full international level prior to being called up.

Group A

Jordan 
Coach: Jamal Abu-Abed

Palestine 
Coach: Abdul Fattah Arar

Qatar 
Coach:  Félix Sánchez

Yemen 
Coach: Amin Al-Sanini

Group B

Bahrain 
Coach: Marjan Eid

Iran 
Coach: Mohammad Khakpour

Saudi Arabia 
Coach: Bandar Juaithen

Group C

Oman 
Coach: Hamad Al-Azani

Syria 
Coach: Muhannad Al-Fakeer

United Arab Emirates 
Coach: Abdullah Mesfer

References

WAFF Championship